Tams-Witmark is an American company that provides professional and amateur theaters license to Broadway musical scripts and scores. Among the many notable properties handled by the company are Kiss Me, Kate; My Fair Lady; Gypsy; Bye Bye Birdie; Hello, Dolly!; Cabaret; Man of La Mancha and A Chorus Line. The company has also acquired numerous properties often inspired by or based upon motion pictures or comic strips, such as 42nd Street, The Wizard of Oz, Meet Me In St. Louis, You're A Good Man, Charlie Brown, and Li'l Abner. The company has also prepared for licensing simpler, shorter derivative works for performance by elementary and middle school students, such as an abbreviated version of Bye, Bye Birdie.

History
In January, 1925, the company was formed as a merger of the Arthur W. Tams Music Library (1870) and the M. Witmark & Sons Music Library. At that time, the company managed the works of such notable composers as John Philip Sousa, Franz Lehár and Victor Herbert. Shortly after consolidation, it also began to manage music by George and Ira Gershwin, Cole Porter, Jerome Kern, Guy Bolton and P.G. Wodehouse. It added to its collection during those early years two of its most popular works, Anything Goes and Girl Crazy, on which was based the musical Crazy for You. The company has continued to expand its collection with many notable and award-winning musicals, including more recently The Will Rogers Follies, Titanic and City of Angels.

It was announced that Tams-Witmark now holds the licensing to "Lysistrata Jones".

Tams-Witmark was acquired by Concord Bicycle Music in early 2018.

References

External links 
Insert the following code string directly under the ==External links== heading.

 Mills Music Library Special Collections, Tams-Witmark / Wisconsin Collection
 Official site

American theatre managers and producers
Theatre in the United States
Music organizations based in the United States